The New Orleans Office of Homeland Security & Emergency Preparedness (NOHSEP) was formed in 2008 following the merger of the Office of Emergency Preparedness and Office of Homeland Security.

The agency
As the "umbrella" public safety agency for the City of New Orleans, NOHSEP provides coordinating oversight to public safety entities such as the New Orleans Police Department, New Orleans Fire Department and New Orleans Emergency Medical Services. The Office is responsible for the development and implementation of the City's emergency management framework and regularly conducts exercises to ensure compliance with these protocols. NOHSEP also operates the City's Emergency Operations Center (CEOC) where stakeholders coordinate response to crises that may occur in the City and surrounding region.

The Office is structured in two divisions: Response and Interoperability and Planning & Preparedness.

It also manages the NOLA Ready preparedness program, including the NOLA Ready Emergency Alert System which allows citizens, visitors and others to receive automated alerts directly from the municipal government and other stakeholders.

External links
Official website

Homeland Security and Emergency Preparedness, Office of
New York
Emergency management in the United States